John Forest  was the Dean of Wells from 1425 to 1446.

References

Deans of Wells
15th-century English people